Crime invasion: Britain’s New Underworld is a 10 part is a documentary television programme produced in the United Kingdom by Vashca for the television station Virgin 1.

This documentary series investigates the new organised crime cells that now dominate Britain's underworld, such as the Yardies and Turkish mafia. Each of the gangs featured in the series has its roots in other countries and have been able to successfully establish bases in Britain, from where they now operate.

The documentary also focussed on how the police, customs and other agencies are working to combat these growing crime networks and will include testimonies from victims and gang members.

The Executive Producer is Glenn Barden.

Episodes

References

External links
Virgin 1 Website
Vashca Website

2007 British television series debuts
2000s British documentary television series
2000s British crime television series
Channel One (British and Irish TV channel) original programming